is a 1998 Japanese film based on the Beast Wars II: Super Life-Form Transformers anime series, a Japan-only spinoff of the Beast Wars television show. The film was never released outside Japan because Beast Wars II aired only in Japan, as a filler series that aired between dubbing the first and second seasons of Beast Wars in Japan. It was released as part of Beast Wars Special Super Lifeform Transformers (ビーストウォーズ スペーシャル 超生命体トランスフォーマー), as one of three features within it. The others are Clash! Beast Warriors, which is a clip show that recaps the first season of Beast Wars and Beast Wars Metals which was the Japanese dubbed version of the Beast Wars season 2 episode; "Bad Spark". The entire special was distributed to Japanese theatres by Toei Company though Ashi Productions provided the animation for the Beast Wars II portion of the movie.

The film revolves around the Maximals, led by Lio Convoy, the Predacons led by Galvatron and a mysterious device that has crashed on Planet Gaia (a future version of Earth), leading to the arrival of Maximal warrior, and the protagonist of the original Beast Wars series, Optimus Primal. Galvatron also uses the device to summon a monster Decepticon called Majin Zarak who threatens to destroy all the Maximals.

Plot
In Gaia's atmosphere, the Jointrons and the Seacons battle each other but both factions are interrupted by the arrival of a large spaceship which rams into them and sends them all flying into space before crash landing on the planet, and the Maximals and Predacons are immediately alerted. On the Galvaburg II, Gigastorm recommends destroying the ship but Galvatron is interested and believes it may hold good fortune for the Predacons. On the Yukikaze Lio Convoy orders a unit sent to investigate the ship but Lio Junior, Lio Convoy's son, wishes to go but the other Maximals shoot him down, but Tasmania Kid stands up for him and asks if both can go and Lio Convoy approves and has Stanton and Skywarp accompany also. The 4 Maximals arrive at the ship and discover a “teleport gate”, an ancient device capable of opening a doorway into the past and transporting any living creature into the present, Transformers included but it requires a control unit to function. When Lio Junior finds it the Predacon Combaticons Hellscream, Dirgegun, Thrustor and Max-B swoop in and steals it but Lio Junior dives off after it alone and the Predacons overpower and nearly kill him, but before Hellscream can fire a finishing blow Kid takes the hit as the other Maximals arrive and scare off the Predacons and secure the control unit.

When Kid doesn't respond to medical treatment the other Maximals blame Lio Junior for his condition and he becomes mad at them as they have the ship and the control unit and is frustrated of not having any respect. Lio Convoy though agrees with his troops and scolds Lio Junior's actions calling him reckless, impatient and is more concerned with destroying Predacons, not protecting innocent lives as per the Maximals code. Lio Junior though snaps and runs off vowing to kill the Predacons himself but forgetting to return the control unit first. As the Maximals return to their ship to tend to Kid's wounds Dirgegun informs Galvatron how the machine works and seeking advantage of Lio Junior's feud with his father, seeks him out and deceives him. He tells Lio Junior that the Predacons accidentally activated the teleport gate and it will self-destruct in under an hour and destroy the whole planet unless the control unit is returned. A barely functioning Tasmania Kid however arrives and begs Lio Junior not to trust him but Galvatron knocks him out and despite his hatred for Galvatron, Lio Junior accompanies him back to the Galvaburg to shut down the machine, and to prove his worth to the Maximals, but once Galvatron has the control unit he drops the facade and has Lio Junior imprisoned in the ship. Galvatron announces his intention to the Predacons, and Lio Junior, to summon the Predacon Megatron from the Beast Wars on prehistoric Earth (set during Beast Wars) to assist him destroying the Maximals.

After Kid awakens and returns to the Maximal's ship he informs Lio Convoy of his son's defection and Galvatron having possession of the control unit so Lio Convoy orders the Maximals to rescue his son and stop Galvatron from activating the teleport gate. Before doing so Lio Convoy expresses a deep resentment for his son's actions but Kid begs him not to treat him so harshly as he is just young, and Lio Convoy eases up. Elsewhere Gigastorm activates the teleport gate to summon Megatron but miscalculates and instead summons the colossal Decepticon giant Majin Zarak but due to his immense strength and arsenal of weapons Galvatron is even more pleased. Galvatron assumes command of the seemingly mindless giant and transforms him into aircraft carrier mode and takes Hellscream, Max-B and the Autorollers to face down the Maximals while Dirgegun and Thrustor guard Lio Junior.

The Maximals detect the arrival of Majin Zarak, much to their horror, and prepare to face him using a small shuttle but Zarak's firepower proves too intense to evade and they regroup for a land ambush. Meanwhile, Lio Junior escapes as Stanton and Skywarp arrive and Lio Junior apologises for his rash behaviour and asks them to accompany him to the teleport gate, as he plans to even the odds. They agree and the trio combine into Magnaboss who easily defeats Thrustor and Dirgegun but not before the former delivers a fatal blow to his chest and with his last ounce of strength, Magnaboss uses his own spark energy to activate the teleport gate and summon someone else to assist them.

In a canyon Lio Convoy leads the other Maximals against the Predacons, using Majin Zarak as their new base. The Maximals are able to force Hellscream, Max-B and the Autorollers into retreating but Galvatron and Gigastorm continue to have Zarak attack them and though Lio Convoy is able to defeat Gigastorm, Galvatron eventually unveils Zarak's robot mode to deliver a massive energy burst to vaporise the area and believing all the present Maximals to be destroyed but receives a call from a “Convoy” challenging him to another fight in “Point B-2”. Believing Lio Convoy to have sent the message Galvatron accepts and takes Majin Zarak to the point. Underground however a barely conscious Lio Convoy is contacted by a familiar voice who informs him that his son nearly killed himself to summon him to the present time and praises Lio Convoy's abilities as a commander and asks to team up, one commander to another.

When Lio Convoy wakes up he discovers every Maximals has survived the blast, including a fully recovered Tasmania Kid, and Lio Convoy apologises to Magnaboss for mistreating him and is praised for his selfless act and is introduced to the legendary former Maximal commander from the past: Optimus Primal who agrees to follow Lio Convoy's lead into battle against Galvatron and Majin Zarak. Magnaboss begs to participate also but Lio Convoy forbids it with his injuries but Kid persuades to him to change his mind when he merges with Magnaboss to give him his needed strength back. Galvatron and Majin Zarak arrive at Point B-2 but Galvatron is enraged to learn that it wasn't Lio Convoy who sent the call but Optimus and attempts to kill both of them, but is stopped by Magnaboss who tosses Zarak and throws Galvatron out of his ship-mode and is saved by Gigastorm but vows revenge.

With Majin Zarak inoperable the battle appears won but Zarak transforms on his own will revealing he has a sentience of his own and was never under Galvatron's control to begin with and attacks the Maximals using numerous attack methods and severely injuring Bighorn and Apache, Kid and Magnaboss leaving only Lio Convoy and Optimus to fight Majin Zarak. However, Scuba and Diver learn that Zarak's weakness is his third eye as his nerve clusters are gathered there and as Zarak moves in to kill both commanders they combine their Energon Matrix powers and immensely power each other up as they launch a combined attack against Zarak and kill him. After the battle Optimus prepares to return to his own time in the Beast Wars on prehistoric Earth, Gaia's pastime counterpart, and though the other Maximals beg him to stay Optimus knows his presence will endanger existence itself, supported by Apache's theory that the civilization who created the teleport gate sent it to Gaia preciously to be destroyed. Before leaving Optimus commends Lio Convoy and the other Maximals for their unity and accomplishment and is honoured to have battled alongside them and departs back to his own time as Lio Convoy orders the teleport gate destroyed behind him to prevent its power from being abused again.

Characters

Cast
Maximals
Hozumi Gōda as Lio Convoy/Flash Lio Convoy
Takehito Koyasu as Optimus Primal/Burning Convoy
Yumiko Kobayashi as Lio Junior, Magnaboss
Mantarô Iwao as Skywarp
Hiroaki Harakawa as Santon
Ryō Naitō as DJ, Tripledacus
Daisuke Ishikawa as Motorarm
Takeshi Maeda as Gimlet
Katashi Ishizuka as Tasmania Kid
Sanryo Odaka as Apache
Masami Iwasaki as Bighorn
Kenji Nakano as Diver
Yūji Kishi as Scuba

Predacons
Tetsuo Komura as Galvatron
Takashi Matsuyama as Gigastorm
Hiroki Takahashi as Hellscream
Eiji Takemoto as Dirgegun
Junji Sanechika as Thrustol
Takeshi Watanabe as Max B
Kazuhiko Nishimatsu as God Neptune, Halfshell

Other
Haruhi Nanao as Computer Voice
Takeshi Watanabe as Bigmos

References

IMDb page

External links
 
 

1998 films
1998 anime films
1990s adventure films
1990s science fiction films
Adventure anime and manga
Animated films based on animated series
Japanese animated films
Mecha anime and manga
Transformers (franchise) animated films
Ashi Productions
Films set in the United States
Films directed by Akira Nishimori
Lio Convoy's Close Call!
1990s American films